is a former Japanese football player. He last played for Honda FC.

Club statistics
Updated to 2 February 2018.

References

External links

Profile at Fukushima United FC

1988 births
Living people
Association football people from Shizuoka Prefecture
Japanese footballers
J1 League players
J2 League players
J3 League players
Japan Football League players
Ventforet Kofu players
Fukushima United FC players
Honda FC players
Association football forwards